Les Pechs-du-Vers is a commune in the department of Lot, southern France. The municipality was established on 1 January 2016 by merger of the former communes of Saint-Cernin and Saint-Martin-de-Vers.

See also 
Communes of the Lot department

References 

Communes of Lot (department)